Jorgheh (also Romanized as Jargheh) is a village in Qarah Bulaq Rural District, Sheshdeh and Qarah Bulaq District, Fasa County, Fars Province, Iran. At the 2006 census, its population was 2,057, in 453 families.

References 

Populated places in Fasa County